Colin J. Ewen is Emeritus Professor of English Linguistics and Phonology at Leiden University. He is known for his works on phonology and is an editor of the journal Phonology.

Books
 Principles of Dependency Phonology (Cambridge Studies in Linguistics), with John Mathieson Anderson
 The Phonological Structure of Words: An Introduction (2001, with Harry van der Hulst). . Cambridge University Press.
 The Blackwell Companion to Phonology, Marc van Oostendorp, Colin J. Ewen, Elizabeth V. Hume and Keren Rice (eds.), Wiley Blackwell, London. 
 Headhood, Elements, Specification and Contrastivity: Phonological Papers in Honour of John Anderson (Current Issues in Linguistic Theory),  Philip Carr, Jacques Durand and Colin J. Ewen (eds.), John Benjamins Publishing Company, 2005

References

External links
Colin J. Ewen

Phonologists
Academic staff of Leiden University
Alumni of the University of Edinburgh
Linguists from the United Kingdom
Linguists from the Netherlands
Living people
Year of birth missing (living people)
Linguistics journal editors